The 2022 Missouri House of Representatives election took place on November 8, 2022, as part of the biennial 2022 United States elections. All 163 seats in the Missouri House of Representatives were up for election.

Predictions

Closest races 
Seats where the margin of victory was under 10%:

References

See also 

Missouri House
Missouri House of Representatives elections
2022 Missouri elections